Scatology is the debut studio album by English experimental music group Coil. It was recorded at various studios in London during 1984 and produced by the band along with JG Thirlwell; the album features a prominent appearance of Stephen Thrower, who subsequently became an official member of Coil starting with the group's following album, Horse Rotorvator. Despite its title, the album focuses on alchemy, mainly an idea of turning base matter into gold. The record contains a wide array of cultural references, including to people such as Marquis de Sade, Alfred Jarry, Salvador Dalí, Charles Manson, and others.

Scatology was first released in 1985 (with a 1984 copyright date) on LP, by Force & Form and K.422 (Some Bizzare Records sublabel). It was reissued by Force & Form in 1988 on CD and later by Threshold House in 2001. Scatology’s sole single featured the extended remix of "Panic" with a cover version of "Tainted Love" on its B-side. Mainly positively received by critics, Scatology is considered to be one of Coil's essential releases, and moreover of the 1980s industrial scene.

Background and recording
Work on Scatology began in May 1984, soon after the release of Coil's debut EP How to Destroy Angels. Early on, a track entitled "The Sewage Worker's Birthday Party" was recorded during sessions of the abovementioned EP. 

Recording sessions were held at Wave Studios, Aosis Studios and Bar Maldoror (all situated in London). Several tracks during these sessions were recorded, but were not released or metamorphosed into other tracks. The core duo of the band, including Peter Christopherson and John Balance, was extended with an appearance of J. G. Thirlwell of Foetus and Stephen Thrower, the latter of whom met Coil for the first time in August 1984.

Packaging
Different editions of the album featured a variety of packaging designs. For the original LP release, the initial black sun design was covered by a postcard with a motif of a swirling staircase known as the "Anal Staircase." The second edition had the "Sexual Architecture" postcard pasted on a random selection of copies with uncovered ones revealing the original black sun design.

The 1988 CD edition featured artwork depicting a naked pair of buttocks enclosed by an upside-down cross, with the original black sun underneath, seemingly inspired by Man Ray’s Monument to Sade photography; the 2001 reissue features a revised artwork from the 1988 edition, with a slogan “Stevo, Pay Us What You Owe Us!” referencing the band's dispute with Stevo Pearce.

Track listing

Original LP release (1984)

CD releases

Personnel
All information adapted from 1984 release sleeve except where noted.

Coil
 John Balance – lead vocals and lyrics , guitars , synthesizer , bass 
 Peter Christopherson – programming and sampling, piano, backing vocals

Additional musicians
 JG Thirlwell  –  programming and sampling 
 Stephen Thrower – clarinet , percussion 
 Gavin Friday – lead vocals and lyrics 
 Alex Fergusson – acoustic guitar 
 Marc Almond  – guitar

Technical personnel
 Coil – co-production, mixing
 JG Thirlwell  – co-production, mixing
 Warne Livesey – engineer
 Christian Fouquet and Lawrence Watson – photography
 Thighpaulsandra – remastering

Charts

References

Notes

Sources

Bibliography

Scatology's liner notes
 
 
 
Books
 
 
 
 
 
 
 
Articles (including reviews)

External links
 
 
 Scatology at Brainwashed

1984 debut albums
Coil (band) albums
Threshold House albums
Albums produced by JG Thirlwell